The 2013 Gainesville Mayoral Election was held on April 16, 2013, electing a new mayor of Gainesville, Florida. Gainesville City Commissioner Ed Brady was elected in the runoff, defeating incumbent mayor Craig Lowe. The first round took place March 19, 2013.

Candidates

Declared 

 Ed Braddy, city commissioner
 Scherwin Henry, biologist
 Pete Johnson, business consultant
 Craig Lowe, incumbent mayor
 Donald Shephard, University of Florida groundskeeper
 Mark Venzke, cab driver, landscape architect, and antique railway conductor

Primary Election

General Election

References 

Mayoral elections
Gainesville, Florida